Tara June Winch (born 1983) is an Australian writer. She is the 2020 winner of the Miles Franklin Award for her book The Yield.

Biography
Tara June Winch was born in Wollongong, New South Wales, Australia in 1983. Her father is from the Wiradjuri nation in western New South Wales, and she grew up in the coastal area of Woonona within the Wollongong region. She often explores the two geographical places in her fiction. She is based in Australia and France.

Her first novel, Swallow the Air (2006), won several Australian literary awards. The judges for The Sydney Morning Herald Best Young Novelists award wrote that the book "is distinguished by its natural grace and vivid language" and that "As with many first books it deals with issues of family, growing up and stepping into the world. But it strives to connect these experiences to broader social issues, though never in a didactic fashion".

In 2008 the Rolex Mentor and Protégé Arts Initiative supported her mentorship under Nobel Prize-winning author Wole Soyinka.

The critical reception for her second book, After the Carnage (2016), was positive. A review in The Australian stated that "Winch can pack a punch and break your heart within a few pages" and that "The personal-is-political worldview flexes Winch's considerable literary muscle".

Her 2019 novel The Yield won seven national Australian literary awards in 2020, including the Prime Minister's Literary Award for fiction and the Miles Franklin Literary Award.

Awards and nominations
2003: State Library of Queensland Young Writers Award, Runner up and Maureen Donahoe Encouragement award
2004: Queensland Premier's Literary Awards, David Unaipon Award for unpublished Indigenous writers
2006: Victorian Premier's Literary Award for Indigenous Writing
2007: Dobbie Award
2007: New South Wales Premier's Literary Awards, UTS Award for New Writing
2007: The Sydney Morning Herald, Best Young Australian Novelists Award
2007: Queensland Premier's Literary Awards: Shortlisted
2007: The Age Book of the Year: Shortlisted
2008: Literature Recipient of the Rolex Mentor and Protégé Arts Initiative. Wole Soyinka was her mentor for this event.
2008: nominated for the Deadly Sounds Aboriginal and Torres Strait Islander Music, Sport, Entertainment and Community Awards – Outstanding Achievement in Literature.
2016: Victorian Premier's Literary Awards – "Highly commended"
2017: New South Wales Premier's Literary Awards Christina Stead Prize for Fiction – Shortlisted
2017: Queensland Literary Awards Short Story Collection – Shortlisted
2020: Victorian Premier's Prize for Fiction – Shortlisted for The Yield
2020: Stella Prize – Shortlisted for The Yield
2020: New South Wales Premier's Literary Awards Book of the Year, Christina Stead Prize for Fiction and People's Choice Award for The Yield
2020: Miles Franklin Award – Won for The Yield
2020: Queensland Literary Awards, Fiction Book Award – Shortlisted for The Yield
2020: Voss Literary Prize – Won for The Yield
2020: Prime Minister's Literary Award for Fiction – Won for The Yield
2022: Adelaide Festival Awards for Literature Fiction Award – Shortlisted for The Yield

Bibliography

Books

Anthologies

Essays and reporting

Film
 Carriberrie (screenwriter) Winch, Tara June (2018)

References

External links

1983 births
Living people
20th-century Australian short story writers
20th-century Australian women writers
Australian people of English descent
Australian women novelists
Australian women short story writers
Indigenous Australian writers
Miles Franklin Award winners
People from Wollongong
Wiradjuri people
Writers from New South Wales
Australian expatriates in France